Yu Huijiao is the founder and chairman of YTO Express, a Chinese express courier service.

Career 
After the failure of his architecture firm, Yu founded a courier service to help pay his bankruptcy bills. Initially, he and his wife had 15 employees who delivered packages by bicycle in Tonglu County, near Hangzhou. , YTO Express employs over 22 thousand people across mainland China and Hong Kong, with an annual net income of 1.4 billion RMB (~US$213 million). Yu remains chairman of the company.

According to Forbes, Yu is personally worth US$3.4 billion as of 2017; however, the combined wealth of his immediate family is US$7.5 billion. Forbes listed Yu's wife, Zhang Xiaojuan, as the 12th richest self-made female billionaire in the world.

References 

Billionaires from Zhejiang
Living people
21st-century Chinese businesspeople
Year of birth missing (living people)
Chinese company founders
Chinese businesspeople in shipping
Businesspeople from Hangzhou